The Europe Zone was one of the three regional zones of the 1980 Davis Cup.

30 teams entered the Europe Zone, competing across 2 sub-zones. 26 teams entered the competition in the qualifying round, competing for 4 places in each sub-zone's main draw to join the 4 finalists from the 1979 Europe Zone. The winners of each sub-zone's main draw went on to compete in the Inter-Zonal Zone against the winners of the Americas Zone and Eastern Zone.

Italy defeated Sweden in the Zone A final, and Czechoslovakia defeated Romania in the Zone B final, resulting in both Italy and Czechoslovakia progressing to the Inter-Zonal Zone.

Zone A

Pre-qualifying round

Draw

Results
Luxembourg vs. Turkey

Preliminary rounds

Draw

First round
Israel vs. Monaco

Ireland vs. Bulgaria

Netherlands vs. Denmark

Norway vs. Turkey

Qualifying round
Switzerland vs. Israel

Bulgaria vs. Hungary

Spain vs. Netherlands

West Germany vs. Norway

Main draw

Draw

Quarterfinals
Switzerland vs. Hungary

Spain vs. West Germany

Semifinals
Italy vs. Switzerland

Sweden vs. West Germany

Final
Italy vs. Sweden

Zone B

Pre-qualifying round

Draw

Results
Algeria vs. Morocco

Preliminary rounds

Draw

First round
Morocco vs. Belgium

Yugoslavia vs. Portugal

Greece vs. Soviet Union

Finland vs. Egypt

Qualifying round
Belgium vs. Austria

Yugoslavia vs. Romania

France vs. Soviet Union

Finland vs. Poland

Main draw

Draw

Quarterfinals
Romania vs. Austria

France vs. Finland

Semifinals
Great Britain vs. Romania

Czechoslovakia vs. France

Final
Romania vs. Czechoslovakia

References

Davis Cup Europe/Africa Zone
Europe Zone
Davis Cup
Davis Cup
Davis Cup
Davis Cup
Davis Cup
Davis Cup
Davis Cup
Davis Cup